Charlie Stubbs is a fictional character from the British ITV soap opera Coronation Street, played by Bill Ward. He made his first appearance during the episode broadcast on 10 November 2003 and last appearance on 15 January 2007.

During his time on the programme, Charlie gradually became the show's main antagonist after being transpired to have a narcissistic, manipulative and despicable streak. This became evident during most of the character's story arc, which saw Charlie spark a relationship local landlady Shelley Unwin (Sally Lindsay) - whom he ends up mistreating, up to the point where he clashes with her interfering mother Bev (Susie Blake), before she eventually jilts him at their wedding. He then went on to proceed in forming a close friendship with his colleague Jason Grimshaw (Ryan Thomas); instigate a feud with Shelley's ex-husband Peter Barlow (Chris Gascoyne) after assaulting him; embark on an affair with Jason's girlfriend Maria Sutherland (Samia Smith); attempt to drown local teenager David Platt (Jack P. Shepherd) in retribution for the latter trying to blackmail him; and repeatedly clashes with Maria's best friend Claire Peacock (Julia Haworth) over his antagonistic nature.

In his exit storyline, Charlie recoups his once-broken romance with Peter's stepsister Tracy Barlow (Kate Ford) - who, unbeknownst to him, is plotting to exact revenge on the character after discovering the extent of his affairs and deceit. This ultimately results in Tracy attacking Charlie with an ornament, which consequently results in Charlie being hospitalised and later dying of his injuries.

Storylines
Charlie Stubbs first arrived in Weatherfield along with one of his fellow builders. Upon arrival, they become outraged when local factory owner Mike Baldwin (Johnny Briggs) refuses to move his car so they could park their vehicle. In retaliation, they used a bulldozer to move Mike's car and it was narrowly saved from being smashed up. Charlie later began dating Shelley Unwin (Sally Lindsay), which further escalated into a relationship. However, Charlie was unfaithful. When arsonist Maya Sharma (Sasha Behar) set fire to the Corner Shop on Coronation Street, Charlie and Ciaran McCarthy (Keith Duffy) broke in and rescued Dev (Jimmi Harkishin) and Sunita Alahan (Shobna Gulati).

Charlie eventually began harassing Shelley at every opportunity. At one point, he tried to make her choose between him and her mother, Bev (Susie Blake). On one occasion he ripped out Shelley's earrings in a fit of rage. When he threatened his colleague Jason Grimshaw (Ryan Thomas) for a sealant gun, Betty Williams (Betty Driver) overheard their conversation on the phone and thought Charlie wanted a genuine firearm. She phoned the police and he was arrested. When he was released, however, he became less violent. He accidentally opened a door which hit Shelley in the face. This caused him to lock her in her bedroom to stop people seeing her face as he knew people would think he was abusing her. Charlie later began to abuse Shelley mentally rather than physically, which caused her to develop agoraphobia. However, she received treatment and Charlie proposed to her, but she jilted him on their wedding day. Despite begging for forgiveness, Shelley refused reconciliation.

In 2005, Charlie began a relationship with Tracy Barlow (Kate Ford). He convinced her to move in with him and later in February 2006, manipulated her into having her daughter Amy (Madison Hampson/Amber Chadwick) move in with her parents. In turn, Tracy began to manipulate Charlie. She pretended to be pregnant and used the money he gave her for an abortion to buy expensive shoes and used her "grief" to have him allow Amy to move back in. When Shelley visited before her mother's marriage to Fred Elliott (John Savident), she and Charlie had a one-night stand. She told Tracy about their night of passion, who accused her of lying. Shelley later revealed that she was pregnant with Charlie's baby but did not allow Charlie to have anything to do with the baby, and left. He and Tracy briefly split but reconciled. Charlie later began an affair with Maria Sutherland (Samia Smith), who was renting his flat. When David Platt (Jack P. Shepherd) discovered the affair he tried to blackmail Charlie, threatening to reveal the affair to Tracy. Charlie retaliated by trying to drown David in the bath. When Tracy eventually found out about the affair, they split once more. Tracy began to plot revenge against Charlie and pretended to make amends with Charlie. She pretended he was abusing her to the point of burning herself with an iron to make it look like Charlie was responsible for her injuries. Charlie eventually realised his partner was seeking revenge and when he was about to tell her their relationship was over, she insisted on performing a lap dance for him. She hit him round the head with a heavy ornament, and he later died in hospital. She claimed she had killed him in self-defence but the court found her guilty and she was given a life sentence.

Creation and development
Actor Bill Ward was cast in the role of Charlie. Bill Ward signed a new contract with the British soap opera in early 2005 because the producers planned "to build Charlie's narcissistic and sadistic behavior towards Shelley (Sally Lindsay)" throughout the year.

Upon the announcement that the character would begin a romance with Tracy Barlow (Kate Ford), a Coronation Street insider revealed that it was "a piece of genius by the writers pairing the show's biggest bitch with the vilest villain", and that "the antics they will get up to will obviously cause misery and heartache for many people." It was also revealed that "it was decided that the two characters of Charlie and Tracy were very much part of the programmes long-term future", and that it "therefore made sense to cement them together as a couple and to give them storylines guaranteed to make them two of Weatherfield's 'most hated'."

Charlie's character was expected to become "the most hated man on telly" when it was announced that he would embark on an affair and manipulate Maria Sutherland (Samia Smith).

Bill Ward "shocked" Coronation Street producers by deciding to leave the serial a few months into his then-current contract, since they had "expected him to stay on after giving him another top storyline". The producers claimed that Bill was "an asset to the show", and that they "would have been developing further storylines for the character."

Reception
In 2005, actor Bill Ward claimed that people approached him regarding the abuse his character gave to Shelley Unwin (Sally Lindsay). He said that "every now and then, after a couple of beers, somebody will come up and say 'She deserves it, doesn't she?'", and that "they think Charlie is a hero and that it's all legitimate and acceptable behaviour, which it isn't." He also revealed that he "had to be more wary" about where he went since his character started his "reign of terror", and that he had notes left on his car, which he found "worrying and unnerving". Despite claiming some people condoned his behaviour, he also said that some people told him to "be nicer to that Shelley". Bill thought that his character was "a shocking man who behaves abysmally", but that as an actor he had to "justify everything he does".

Grace Dent, an editor of The Guardian, described the character of Charlie as "a brilliant soap baddie", as a "philanderer and a mysoginist [sic]", and a "violent bully and a relentless liar." She opined that Charlie "ended almost every scene with a solitary moment spent smirking to himself about his latest huge fib", and that "by the time Charlie died, he was having so many smirks behind so many backs he spent many scenes pulling a face like he had a raspberry pip stuck in his dentures." Charlie has also been described as "a bona fide Coronation Street villain"  and as "Greater Manchester's very own JR Ewing". The character has been opined to be "arguably the most graphic soap death".

The episode which featured the character's murder was listed as the second-most watched for any programme on TV in 2007, having been watched by 13.1 million viewers.

Bill Ward received the "Best Exit" award in British Soap Awards 2007 for his role in the character of Charlie. The same year, the storyline which saw Charlie murdered by Tracy Barlow received the "Best Storyline" award. He was also nominated for the Inside Soap "Best Bad Boy" award.

See also
List of Coronation Street characters (2003)
List of soap opera villains

References

External links
Charlie Stubbs at corrie.net

Coronation Street characters
Fictional construction workers
Television characters introduced in 2003
Male characters in television
Male villains
Fictional murdered people